Julien d'Ortoli (born 7 October 1983) is a French sailor in the 49er FX class. Together with Noé Delpech he won a bronze medal at the 2013 European Championships and placed fifth at the 2016 Olympics.

D'Ortoli took up sailing in 1990 and since 2007 races with Delpech. The pair has a nickname Juno from the combination of the first two letters of their given names.

References

External links
 
 
 
 

1983 births
Living people
French male sailors (sport)
Olympic sailors of France
Sailors at the 2016 Summer Olympics – 49er FX